Obama ficki is a large species of Brazilian land planarian in the subfamily Geoplaninae.

Description 
Obama ficki is a large land planarian with a broad and flat leaf-like body. The largest specimens reach more than 20 cm in length. The color of the dorsum is composed by a greyish-brown background covered with numerous fine black spots. The ventral side is orange.

The several eyes of O. ficki are distributed marginally in the first centimeters of the body and posteriorly become dorsal, occupying around 30% of the body width at the median third of the body.

Distribution 
The habitat of O. ficki includes seasonal and moist forests in northeast Rio Grande do Sul and east Santa Catarina, southern Brazil.

References 

Geoplanidae
Invertebrates of Brazil